Reintegration may refer to:

Reintegration (Martinism), the basic doctrine of Martinism
Reintegrationism, the linguistic and cultural movement in Galicia which defends the unity of Galician and Portuguese as a single language
Social integration, the movement of minority groups of a society into the mainstream of the society